Ronia, the Robber's Daughter (Swedish: Ronja rövardotter) is a children's fantasy book by the Swedish author Astrid Lindgren, first published in 1981.

The book has been adapted as a prize-winning 1984 film, a Danish and a German musical, and a Japanese anime. It has been translated into at least 39 languages.

Plot summary

Ronia is a girl growing up among a clan of robbers living in a castle in the woodlands of early-Medieval Scandinavia.  As the only child of Matt, the chief, she is expected to become the leader of the clan someday.  Their castle, Matt's Fort, is split into two parts by a lightning bolt on the day of Ronia's birth. Ronia grows up with Matt's clan of robbers as her only company, until a rival robber group led by Borka moves into the other half of the castle, exacerbating the longstanding rivalry between the two bands.

One day, Ronia sees Birk Borkason, the only son of Borka, idling by the chasm. He is the only other child she has ever met, and so she is sorry that he is a Borka. He engages her in a game of jumping across, which does not end until Birk almost falls down.  Ronia saves him, and they eventually become friends.

The following winter is long and cold and although Matt's robbers are well fed, their counterparts are suffering on the other side of the chasm. Ronia brings food to Birk through a secret passageway. They get very close but both know that they cannot tell their families. Later that year, Birk is captured by Ronia's father. Ronia gives herself to the Borkas so she must be exchanged, but as a result, her father disowns her and refuses to acknowledge her as his daughter. Birk and Ronia run away to the woods, where they live in a cave and experience several harrowing adventures with the wood's indigenous wildlife, including trolls, forest gnomes, and harpies. Ultimately their families repent of their feuding, and everyone is reunited, but the story concludes with both Ronia and Birk deciding that the robber's life is not for them.

Adaptations

Literature
In 1983, Trina Schart Hyman illustrated her own version of the book, which is published by Puffin Books.

Film

In 1984, the book was made into a Swedish fantasy film. It was directed by the Swedish film director Tage Danielsson and adapted for screenplay by Astrid Lindgren herself. It was a major success, becoming the highest-grossing 1984 film in Sweden, and winning a Silver Bear at the 1985 Berlin International Film Festival. More than 1.5 million people attended its screenings in Sweden.

Musical

In 1991 the book was made into a Danish musical called Ronja Røverdatter. The musical is written by Danish composer Sebastian.

In 1994 the book was made into a German musical called Ronja Räubertochter. The musical is written by Axel Bergstedt in the German language, and has orchestra, band and more than one hundred people on the stage.

Stage
A production in the Balver Höhle was performed in 1993 and 2004 in Oberkirch (Baden) in 2006. 

A production of Ronja the Robber's Daughter interpreted by Ronny Danielsson - performed at Stadsteatern Stockholm Sweden 2014, 2016, 2018.

TV-Series
On 6 September 2021 it was announced that a TV series is planned to be produced. Hans Rosenfeldt writes the script while Lisa James Larsson directs the series. Twelve episodes, divided into two seasons, have been ordered. The series is produced by Filmlance Productions, the company behind popular Swedish TV-series such as  Beck, Bron, Caliphate.

Anime

A CGI television series from Japan, which debuted on 11 October 2014. Titled Sanzoku no Musume Ronia, the show is being produced by Dwango, NHK, NHK Enterprises, Polygon Pictures and Studio Ghibli.

Translations

Ronia, the Robber's Daughter has been translated into 39 languages. The two English versions translate the Swedish names differently.

References

External links
 Astrid Lindgren: Ronia, the robber's daughter (Blog)

1981 Swedish novels
1981 children's books
Swedish children's novels
Swedish novels adapted into films
Novels by Astrid Lindgren
Novels set in the Middle Ages
Methuen Publishing books
Rabén & Sjögren books
Swedish fantasy novels
Child characters in literature
Female characters in literature
Astrid Lindgren characters
1981 fantasy novels